Diamonds & Dancefloors is the second studio album by American singer Ava Max. It was released on January 27, 2023, through Atlantic Records. Recorded throughout 2021, the album is a dance-pop record much like Max's debut studio album Heaven & Hell (2020). The album was promoted by the release of five singles: "Maybe You're the Problem", "Million Dollar Baby", "Weapons", "Dancing's Done" and "One of Us". The album debuted in the top ten in various countries, including Austria, Germany, Hungary, Spain and Switzerland.

Background
On February 12, 2022, Max cut off her signature "Max Cut" and dyed her hair red, sparking rumors about the start of a new era. On March 2, 2022, she confirmed that a song titled "Maybe You're the Problem" would be the lead single. She also stated that her upcoming album would be her most personal album to date. In an interview with Billboard, she revealed that she had been working on the album for the whole of 2021, which she refers to as "the hardest year" of her life. She also stated that she was "terrified" as her recently recorded music became more vulnerable.

On June 1, 2022, she revealed the album name and the main original cover art, first on social media, then on The Today Show. Max was seen on the original cover art covered in diamonds on the cover with a diamond in her mouth. The album is set to include 14 tracks in total. The album was set for release on October 14, 2022, but was postponed to January 27, 2023 with the official main cover art which was unveiled on December 19, 2022.

Cover artworks 
The album has three official album artworks, all shot by American photographer Marilyn Hue. The original cover art for Diamonds and Dancefloors was unveiled by Max on June 1, 2022, on her social media platforms. It features a close up of Max covered in diamonds with a diamond in her mouth. The cover was later only used on physical versions of the album; the new one was used on digital and streaming editions. 

The new cover art for the album was unveiled on December 19, 2022, once again on Max's social media platforms. It was taken after the filming of the visualizer for "Dancing's Done", the album's fourth single, featuring Max laying on blue diamonds with sliver ones seen near her head.  In a interview with ET Canada, Max explained why she changed the album's cover:

 The album received a third cover for the CD version of the album as an alternative album cover version; the artwork switches the back cover as the front and the original front as the back cover. The cover features Max standing on a giant tilting diamond while holding a suspended microphone on one hand and pouring champagne from a glass with her other hand.

Music and lyrics
Diamonds & Dancefloors is a pop and dance-pop record with a "synth-pop backbone" and "electropop melodies with some 90s synths and a touch of disco". According to Max, the sound and lyrics of the album "will make you cry and dance at the same time". She described the album's main theme as "basically heartbreak on the dancefloor". Unlike her previous album, Heaven & Hell, Max mentioned that Diamonds & Dancefloors is more about her personal life, especially her past relationships. The album contains lyrics about the deterioration and eventual breakdown of a relationship, as well as empowering and escapist lyrics.

Songs 
Diamonds & Dancefloors opens with "Million Dollar Baby", a pop and Eurodance song, inspired by music from the 2000s. The song interpolates "Can't Fight the Moonlight" (2000) by LeAnn Rimes and contains lyrics based on the theme of empowerment, which begins with grief and ends in emancipation. The second track, "Sleepwalker", is a synth-pop song with "slick" production and a "nocturnal feeling", where Max sings about becoming the obsession of someone who has fallen in love with her. The third track, "Maybe You're the Problem", is a dance-pop and synth-pop song, with influences from Eurodance, Europop and music in the 1980s. The lyrics describe Max's initiation to depart from a relationship with a selfish partner.  The fourth track, "Ghost", is an early 1990s house song with lyrics about not being able to forget an ex-lover. The fifth track, "Hold Up (Wait a Minute)", is a dance-pop song with elements of disco, where Max sings about her growing suspicion of her lover cheating on her with someone else. The sixth track, "Weapons", is a disco-pop and Europop song that contains lyrics about recognizing one's own fallibility and vulnerability and therefore becoming strong and "invincible". It is followed by the album's title track, an early 1990s house song that has been described as a "club anthem", with lyrics of escapism and freedom, inspired by Max's mental state during the COVID-19 Pandemic.

The eighth track, "In the Dark", contains "dark melodies", UK garage beats and lyrics about being loved only at night. It is followed by "Turn Off the Lights", a disco-influenced song where Max "promises euphoria once the lights go out". The tenth track, "One of Us", is a pop song inspired by 1980s disco and dance music, where Max sings about not wanting to hurt her lover. The eleventh track, "Get Outta My Heart", is an electronic dance song where Max sings about ditching an ex-lover. It samples the film score of the 1968 film Twisted Nerve. It is followed by "Cold as Ice", a disco-pop and dance-pop song with male backing vocals. The penultimate track, "Last Night on Earth", is an electro song  with lyrics inspired by the disaster films Geostorm (2017) and San Andreas (2015). The album closes with "Dancing's Done", a Europop song where Max sings about what could happen at the end of the night between her and someone else.

Release and promotion
Diamonds & Dancefloors was released on January 27, 2023 through Atlantic Records. The standard edition of the album was released for digital download and streaming and physically on CD, cassette and vinyl. The CD was released with two different covers and the vinyl record in four different colors. The Japanese edition of the album was released on CD with two bonus tracks: a remix of "Maybe You're the Problem" and a remix of "Million Dollar Baby". Max announced that there would be a deluxe edition of the album and that she will soon embark on her first headlining tour.

From December 21 to 30, 2022, Max held an activity called "12 Days of Diamonds & Dancefloors", where she released a new visualizer every day for twelve days. On the first day, she posted a visualizer for "Dancing's Done" on her YouTube channel. The next day, a snippet of the visualizer for "Weapons" was posted via TikTok. Snippets for the next seven days included the title track, "Turn Off the Lights", "Cold as Ice", "In the Dark", "Last Night on Earth", "Hold Up (Wait a Minute)" and "Get Outta My Heart". "Ghost" was released as the last visualizer for the event. Max then mentioned that she would save three more surprises for the month of January. The full visualizer for "One of Us" was released on January 27, 2023. The visualiser for "Weapons" was released on March 3, 2023.

Singles 
On March 2, 2022, Max announced that "Maybe You're The Problem" would be the lead single of the album. She began teasing the song through snippets and TikTok videos. It was finally released on April 28, 2022, and subsequently debuted and peaked at number 83 on the UK Singles Chart. Max performed the song for the first time on June 1, 2022, on The Today Show, where she also announced the album. She performed the song again at the 2022 LOS40 Music Awards on November 4 of the same year. 

In August 2022, Max began teasing "Million Dollar Baby". The song was released on September 1, 2022, as the second single from the album. On October 13, 2022, Max revealed the track listing of the album along with and the back cover, on social media. Max performed the song at the 2022 MTV Europe Music Awards on November 13, and at the 2022 NRJ Music Awards on November 18. The song appears in the rhythm game Just Dance 2023 Edition, with the choreography performed by Max herself as a coach.

Through TikTok, Max teased the release of the album's third single, "Weapons", which was released on November 10, 2022. On December 20, 2022, Max released "Dancing's Done" as the album's fourth single, which was sent to radio in Italy on January 6, 2023. On January 13, 2023, Max released "One of Us" as the album's fifth single, which was then followed by the album's first promotional single, "Cold as Ice" on January 24, 2023.

Reception 
Diamonds & Dancefloors received a score of 80 out of 100 based on 4 reviews on review aggregator Metacritic, indicating "generally favorable" reception.

The album received generally positive reviews from critics and fans, praising Max's vocal performance, mixture of dance genres, and throwback to the 1980's dance pop genre, while criticism was aimed towards lack of originality and cliché lyrics. Neil Z. Yeung of AllMusic wrote that the album is "deftly executed and ideal for repeat listens" and "it's pure, irresistible thrills from start to finish". Yeung found Max's vocal power "passionate". Sam Franzini of The Line of Best Fit found that the album is "shimmering and twinkling with production that is consistently sharp", although  "we don’t learn much about Max on these songs", because the songs have "no narrative sense".

Track listing

Notes
 signifies a co-producer
 signifies an additional producer
 signifies a vocal producer
"Million Dollar Baby" contains an interpolation of "Can't Fight the Moonlight" (2000), as written by Diane Warren and performed by LeAnn Rimes.
"Get Outta My Heart" contains sampled elements from the Twisted Nerve'' score (1968), composed by Bernard Herrmann.

Personnel
Musicians
 Ava Max – vocals
 Cirkut – all instruments, programming (tracks 1–5, 7–13)
 David Stewart – all instruments, programming (1)
 Abraham Dertner – all instruments, programming (2, 3)
 Jonas Jeberg – all instruments, programming (2, 3)
 Johnny Goldstein – all instruments, programming (5)
 Omer Fedi – all instruments, programming (8)
 Connor McDonough – all instruments, programming (9, 12, 13)
 Burns – all instruments, programming (10)
 Jason Evigan – all instruments, programming (11)
 Jakke Erixson – all instruments, programming (12)

Technical
 Chris Gehringer – mastering
 Tom Norris – mixing (1, 2, 4–13)
 Serban Ghenea – mixing (3, 14)
 John Hanes – engineering (14)
 Bryce Bordone – mixing assistance (3, 14)

Charts

Release history

References

2023 albums
Ava Max albums
Albums produced by Cirkut
Atlantic Records albums